Number Sense is one of several academic events sanctioned by the University Interscholastic League.  It is also a competition held by the Texas Math and Science Coaches Association, using the same rules as the UIL.  It is one of the UIL's oldest academic competitions: the first state title was awarded in 1943.

Number Sense is designed to test students' mental math abilities (i.e., their ability to solve math problems without the aid of calculators or scratch paper).

Eligibility
Students in Grade 4 through Grade 12 are eligible to enter this event.  For competition purposes, separate divisions are held for Grades 4-6, Grades 7-8, and Grades 9-12, with separate subjects covered on each test as follows:
The test for Grades 4-6 covers basic arithmetic and mathematical functions.
The test for Grades 7-8 covers the subjects under Grades 4-6 plus algebra, geometry and number theory.
The test for Grades 9-12 covers the subjects under both Grades 4-6 and Grades 7-8 plus analysis, trigonometry and calculus.

For Grades 4-6 and Grades 7-8 each school may send up to three students per division.  In order for a school to participate in team competition in a division, the school must send three students in that division.

For Grades 9-12 each school may send up to four students; however, in districts with more than eight schools the district executive committee can limit participation to three students per school.  In order for a school to participate in team competition, the school must send at least three students.

Rules and Scoring
The test consists of 80 questions and is limited to only 10 minutes.  There is no intermediate time signal given; at the end of 10 minutes the students must immediately stop writing (they are not allowed to finish incomplete answers started before the stop signal).

The questions must be answered in order; a skipped question is scored as a wrong answer.

Since Number Sense is designed to test students' mental math abilities, no calculators or scratch paper can be used during competition.

In order for a question to be scored as correct the exact answer must be given (no allowance for rounding), except where the question is preceded by an asterisk, in which case for the question to be scored as correct the student's answer must be within 5 percent of the exact answer.

5 points are awarded for each correct answer while 4 points are deducted for each wrong or skipped answer.  However, questions not answered beyond the last attempted answer (defined as any problem where a mark or erasure exists in the answer blank for that problem) are not scored.

Another way to score the contest is to multiply the number of attempted problems by 5 and multiply the number of wrong problems by 9, and then subtracting the wrong number score from the total.

Determining the Winner

Elementary and Junior High
Scoring is posted for only the top six individual places and the top three teams.

There are no tiebreakers for either individual or team competition.

High School Level
The top three individuals and the top team (determined based on the scores of the top three individuals) advance to the next round.  In addition, within each region, the highest-scoring second place team from all district competitions advances as the "wild card" to regional competition (provided the team has four members), and within the state, the highest-scoring second place team from all regional competitions advances as the wild card to the state competition.  Members of advancing teams who did not place individually remain eligible to compete for individual awards at higher levels.

There is no tiebreaker for individual competition; all individuals tied for a place eligible to advance to the next level will advance.

For team competition, the score of the fourth-place individual is used as the tiebreaker.  If a team has only three members it is not eligible to participate in the tiebreaker.  If the fourth-place score still results in a tie, all remaining tied teams will advance.  At the state level, ties for first place are not broken.

For district meet academic championship and district meet sweepstakes awards, points are awarded to the school as follows:
Individual places: 1st—15, 2nd—12, 3rd—10, 4th—8, 5th—6, and 6th—4.
Team places: 1st—9 and 2nd—4.
The maximum number of points a school can earn in Number Sense is 37.

List of prior winners

Individual
NOTE: For privacy reasons, only the winning school is shown.  There was only one state champion for all classes awarded from 1943-44 through 1945-46 (for table purposes the winner is shown in Class A).  Beginning in 1946-47, there were three champions crowned (Classes B, A, and AA; the latter encompassing all schools not in Class A or Class B).  Beginning in 1958-59 all five classes (B, A, AA, AAA, and AAAA) were eligible for championships.  The classifications were renumbered in 1980-81, with Class B becoming Class A and the other classes adding one letter (thus, Class A became Class AA, and so forth).

Team
NOTE: UIL did not recognize a team championship in this event until the 1988-89 scholastic year.

References 

Official UIL Rules for Number Sense--High School
Official UIL Rules for Number Sense--Elementary and Junior High School
Other results resources
UIL Winner's Archive
Other results resources prior to 1980

University Interscholastic League